The 2018 World Aesthetic Gymnastics Championships, the 19th edition of the Aesthetic group gymnastics competition, was held in Budapest, Hungary from June 08 to 10, at the SYMA Sports and Conference Centre.

Participating nations

Medal winners

Results

Senior

The top 12 teams (2 per country) and the host country in Preliminaries qualify to the Finals.

Medal table

References

External links
http://172.104.246.10/resultx.php?id_prop=675
Official page

World Aesthetic Gymnastics Championships
2018 in Hungarian sport
2018 in gymnastics
Gymnastics competitions in Hungary
International sports competitions in Budapest
June 2018 sports events in Europe